The Boardwalk was a bar/nightclub based on the corner of Snig Hill and Bank Street, Sheffield, South Yorkshire, England. The venue played host to many up-and-coming home-grown bands, as well as smaller touring bands and cover acts. In November 2010, the landlord of the venue voluntarily placed the owning company into administration and closed the site indefinitely. Despite an official statement in December of the same year claiming three potential parties to be interested in operating the venue, this did not materialise and the Boardwalk remained closed.

The Boardwalk held an important place in Sheffield's music scene since the 1960s, when it was known as the Black Swan (and later by its local nickname, the Mucky Duck). It played host to a number of high-profile bands including AC/DC and Genesis, with the Clash playing their first gig at the venue on a bill that also included Sex Pistols and Buzzcocks.

In its later years, the music venue had helped facilitate the rise of local bands such as Arctic Monkeys, Tomato Plant, Bromheads Jacket, Milburn, Bring Me the Horizon, and Little Man Tate, with the former naming their first demo Beneath the Boardwalk.

References

External links
The Boardwalk Website
The Boardwalk ents24.com Page

Nightclubs in Sheffield
Music venues in South Yorkshire